Avia Świdnik is a Polish multi-sports club based in Świdnik, Poland.

In the 2021–22 season, the men's football section plays in the Polish III liga, group IV. They have played a total of 21 seasons in II liga. During the 1985–86 season, they reached the quarter-final of the Polish Cup.

2020–21 Avia Świdnik season

External links 
 Official website (Polish)
 Avia Świdnik at the 90minut.pl website (Polish)

Football clubs in Poland
Association football clubs established in 1952
1952 establishments in Poland
Świdnik County
Football clubs in Lublin Voivodeship